The Road to Ensenada is the sixth album by Lyle Lovett, released in 1996.

At the Grammy Awards of 1997, The Road to Ensenada won the Grammy Award for Best Country Album.

Track listing
All songs composed by Lyle Lovett except as noted.

 "Don't Touch My Hat" – 3:47
 "Her First Mistake" – 6:28
 "Fiona" – 4:09
 "That's Right (You're Not from Texas)" (Lovett, Willis Alan Ramsey, Alison Rogers) – 4:54
 "Who Loves You Better" – 4:46
 "Private Conversation" – 4:32
 "Promises" – 3:07
 "It Ought to Be Easier" – 4:11
 "I Can't Love You Anymore" – 3:14
 "Long Tall Texan" (Henry Strzelecki) – 3:27
 "Christmas Morning" – 3:43
 "The Road to Ensenada" – 10:12
 "The Girl in the Corner"—hidden at the end of track 12, following 1:30 of silence

Personnel
 Greg Adams – trumpet
 Sweet Pea Atkinson – baritone vocal
 Sir Harry Bowens – baritone vocal
 Jackson Browne – harmony vocals
 Valerie Carter – background vocals, harmony vocals
 Shawn Colvin – harmony vocals
 Luis Conte – percussion, tambourine, shaker
 Stuart Duncan – fiddle
 Chuck Findley – trombone, trumpet
 Paul Franklin – pedal steel guitar
 Willie Green Jr. – bass vocal
 Gary Herbig – alto saxophone, baritone saxophone, tenor saxophone
 Chris Hillman – harmony vocals
 Russ Kunkel – drums, shaker
 Lyle Lovett – acoustic guitar, rhythm guitar, vocals
 Kate Markowitz – background vocals, harmony vocals
 Arnold McCuller – background vocals, tenor vocals, harmony vocals
 Randy Newman – duet vocal on "Long Tall Texan"
 Dean Parks – acoustic guitar, electric guitar
 Herb Pedersen – harmony vocals
 Don Potter – acoustic guitar, Spanish guitar
 Matt Rollings – piano
 Leland Sklar – bass

Chart performance

References

1996 albums
Lyle Lovett albums
Curb Records albums
MCA Records albums
Grammy Award for Best Country Album